Richard Barber DCL was an English priest in 16th-century.

A Fellow of All Souls' College, Oxford, he was appointed Vicar choral of Chichester Cathedral in 1541; Vicar of the College of Windsor in 1543, a Canon of Lincoln Cathedral in 1552; Rector of Wappenham in  1553; Archdeacon of Bedford in 1559; Archdeacon of Leicester in 1560; Warden of All Souls in 1565; Rector of Harrietsham in Kent, 1570, and of Hanborough in 1572; Treasurer and Canon of Lichfield Cathedral in 1574; and Rector of Yoxall in 1575. He died on 15 February 1590.

Notes 

1590 deaths
Archdeacons of Bedford
Archdeacons of Leicester
Fellows of All Souls College, Oxford
Wardens of All Souls College, Oxford

16th-century English Anglican priests